Merry Xmas is a 2015 American short film directed by Boman Modine and produced by Cinco Dedos Peliculas LLC. The comedic film had its world premiere at the 2015 Tribeca Film Festival in New York City. In June, the short won the Best "Pilot" Award at the 2015 New Media Film Festival in Los Angeles. During Michael Moore's Traverse City Film Festival, the film screened before a work-in-progress cut of Jen Senko's political documentary, The Brainwashing of My Dad, also produced by Matthew Modine and Adam Rackoff. On August 1, 2015, director Boman Modine and co-producer Adam Rackoff were invited to participate in the "After the Credits" interview series where they discussed the process of casting, shooting, and directing Merry Xmas. On December 11, 2015, it was announced that Merry Xmas closed a deal with Shorts International, the parent company of ShortsHD, to release the film on a variety of digital EST platforms including iTunes Movies, Google Play, Amazon Video, and Verizon. During Christmas week, Merry Xmas was featured on the iTunes Short Films page and landed in the top ten sales chart. Of the top ten films, Merry Xmas was the only live-action film and the only short not produced by Disney or DreamWorks.

Story
Merry Xmas tells the story of a mischievous father (Dick Van Dyke) who calls his very busy kids (Matthew Modine and Glenne Headly) to tell them that after 55 years of marriage, he and their mom (Valerie Harper) are getting divorced. Horrified by the news, the children prepare to fly home to stop the divorce and save their parent's marriage.

Film Festivals

References

American short films